Jeong Yeong-seok (born April 14, 1995) is a South Korean curler from Uijeongbu, Gyeonggi-do, South Korea. He currently skips the Gangwon Provincial Office curling team. While playing for the Gyeonggi-do Curling Federation, he skipped his team to victory at the 2020 Korean Curling Championships and later represented South Korea at the 2021 World Men's Curling Championship.

Career
Jeong represented South Korea at the 2014 Pacific-Asia Junior Curling Championships with his team of Kim Seung-min, Oh Seung-hoon, Park Se-won and Noh Chang-hyun. After going 6–2 through the round robin, the team lost to China's Wang Jinbo in the final 8–6, missing out on qualifying for the 2014 World Junior Curling Championships.

In 2020, Jeong skipped his team of Kim San, Park Se-won, Lee Jun-hyung and Kim Seung-min to victory at the 2020 Korean Curling Championships. After losing the 1 vs. 2 page playoff game, his team defeated Kim Soo-hyuk 8–7 in the semifinal and upset defending champions Kim Chang-min 12–10 in the final. Their win earned them the right to represent South Korea at the 2021 World Men's Curling Championship in Calgary, Alberta. For the championship, the team altered their lineup, bringing Kim Jeong-min and Seo Min-guk in to replace Kim San and Kim Seung-min. At the Worlds, they finished with a 2–11 record.

Personal life
Jeong is a full-time curler.

Teams

References

External links

1995 births
Living people
South Korean male curlers
People from Uijeongbu
Sportspeople from Gyeonggi Province
21st-century South Korean people